Co-hosts New Zealand proved the surprise packet of the tournament, winning their first seven games to finish on top of the table after the round robin. The other hosts, Australia, were one of the pre-tournament favorites but lost their first two matches. They recovered somewhat to win four of the remaining six, but narrowly missed out on the semi-finals.  The West Indies also finished with a 4–4 record, but were just behind Australia on run-rate. South Africa made a triumphant return to international cricket with a win over Australia at the SCG in their first match. They and England had solid campaigns and easily qualified for the semis, despite upset losses to Sri Lanka and Zimbabwe respectively. India had a disappointing tournament and never looked likely to progress beyond the round robin. Sri Lanka were still establishing themselves at the highest level and beat only Zimbabwe (who did not yet have Test status) and South Africa.  New Zealand were defeated only twice in the tournament, both times by Pakistan, in their final group match and in the semi-final. Pakistan had been lucky to be in the semi-finals at all: following only one victory in their first five matches, they were also fortunate to scrape a point from the washed-out match against England which appeared to be heading for a heavy English victory (Pak 74 all out, Eng 24/1): eventually they finished one point ahead of Australia with an inferior run-rate.

Points Table

Tournament progression

New Zealand vs Australia

England vs India

Zimbabwe vs Sri Lanka

Pakistan vs West Indies

Sri Lanka vs New Zealand

Australia vs South Africa  
This is South Africa first World Cup win

Pakistan vs Zimbabwe

West Indies vs England

India vs Sri Lanka

South Africa vs New Zealand

West Indies vs Zimbabwe

Australia vs India

Pakistan vs England

South Africa vs Sri Lanka

New Zealand vs Zimbabwe

India vs Pakistan

South Africa vs West Indies

Australia vs England

India vs Zimbabwe

Sri Lanka vs Australia

West Indies vs New Zealand

South Africa vs Pakistan

England vs Sri Lanka

India vs West Indies

Zimbabwe vs South Africa

Pakistan vs Australia

India vs New Zealand

South Africa vs England

West Indies vs Sri Lanka

Australia vs Zimbabwe

England vs New Zealand

India vs South Africa

Sri Lanka vs Pakistan

New Zealand vs Pakistan

Zimbabwe vs England

Australia vs West Indies

References

External links
Cricket World Cup 1992 from Cricinfo

1

ur:عالمی کپ کرکٹ 1992ء